Sunrise is a two-disc compilation of Elvis Presley's studio recordings at Sun Studio from 1953 to 1955, released in 1999, RCA 67675-2. This set features all of the surviving master recordings made by Presley and his accompanists, Scotty Moore and Bill Black, occasionally augmented by other musicians, prior to his arrival on RCA Records in 1956.

Contents 
Tapes for at least three songs have been lost: Sun versions of "I Got A Woman", "Uncle Pen", and "Satisfied". The first would be recorded by Presley during his first RCA session. All of the studio commercial recordings were produced by Sam Phillips, the owner of Sun Studio in Memphis, Tennessee. Phillips released Presley's recording contract to RCA for the substantial sum, in 1955 dollars, of $35,000. This gave RCA the rights to all of Presley's masters recorded at Sun.

The first disc presents all eighteen Sun titles from professional recording sessions during the singer's stay at the label.  The opening ten tracks comprise the A and b sides of the five officially released Presley singles on the Sun label. Outtakes from sessions at Sun were used to fill in catalogue items for RCA, with five used for Presley's debut LP.

The second disc compiles seven alternate takes from the professional studio sessions, with a different alternate of "Blue Moon" from the Take 1 that appears on 1950s box set. The remaining selections derive from acetates or basic recording equipment, and are not of professional sound quality; these are marked with an asterisk in the track listings below. The first four tracks comprise the pre-professional test recordings made by Elvis alone in July 1953 and January 1954. "Fool Fool Fool" and "Shake, Rattle, and Roll" were recorded by the standard Presley trio at an unknown location in Lubbock, Texas, during January 1955; presumably the visit where Buddy Holly witnessed the trio and decided to begin performing rock and roll. "It Wouldn't Be The Same Without You," and the final six tracks from a live performance on the Louisiana Hayride, in Shreveport, Louisiana featuring an augmented band in 1955, are released here for the first time.

The set does not include the three additional alternate takes of "I Love You Because" and the five additional alternates of "I'm Left, You're Right, She's Gone" that appeared on the 1987 two-disc set The Complete Sun Sessions.

Impact 
The set includes "That's All Right (Mama)", one of candidates for being "the first rock and roll record". Elvis' entire period at Sun is one of the seminal events in the birth of rock and roll, specifically also the beginning of the subgenre known as rockabilly. As stated by author Peter Guralnick, opening the liner notes to this set:

"If Elvis Presley had never made another record after his last Sun session in the fall of 1955, there seems little question that his music would have achieved much the same mythic status as Robert Johnson's blues. The body of his work at Sun is so transcendent, so fresh, and so original that even today you can scarcely listen to it in relation to anything but itself.  Like all great art its sources may be obvious, but its overall impact defies explanation."

In 2002, given their importance in the development of American popular music, The Sun Sessions were chosen, by the National Recording Registry of the Library of Congress, to be kept as a bequeathal to posterity. In 2012 Rolling Stone magazine placed Sunrise at number 11 on its list of The 500 Greatest Albums of All Time.

The Rolling Stone listing is confusing because the album pictured is not Sunrise. It is the 1976 compilation The Sun Sessions. The album title is also incorrectly given as The Sun Sessions. The text, however, cites a 2-disc, 1999 RCA release that can only be Sunrise. When Rolling Stone updated its list in 2020, Sunrise was replaced by The Sun Sessions, which was ranked 78th.

For more detailed information on the recording sessions, see Elvis Presley's Sun recordings.

Track listing 
Chart positions for LPs and EPs from Billboard Top Pop Albums chart; positions for singles from Billboard Pop Singles chart except where noted.

Disc one

Disc two

Personnel 
 Elvis Presley – vocal, guitar
 Scotty Moore – guitar on disc one, disc two (tracks 5–19)
 Bill Black –  bass on disc one, disc two (tracks 5–19)
 Jimmie Lott – drums on disc one (track 8)
 Johnny Bernero – drums on disc one (tracks 9, 18, 19)
 Leon Post – piano on disc two (tracks 14–19)
 Sonny Trammel – steel guitar on disc two (tracks 14–19)

References

External links 
 Sun Studio
 Sun Records

1999 compilation albums
Albums recorded at Sun Studio
Compilation albums published posthumously
Elvis Presley compilation albums
RCA Records compilation albums